Yariulvis Cobas (born 18 August 1990) is a Cuban female rower. She competed in the single sculls race at the 2012 Summer Olympics and placed 3rd in Final C and 15th overall.

References

1990 births
Living people
Cuban female rowers
Olympic rowers of Cuba
Rowers at the 2012 Summer Olympics
Rowers at the 2011 Pan American Games
Rowers at the 2015 Pan American Games
Pan American Games gold medalists for Cuba
Pan American Games bronze medalists for Cuba
Pan American Games medalists in rowing
Medalists at the 2011 Pan American Games
Medalists at the 2015 Pan American Games
21st-century Cuban women